Princess Charlotte Sophie of Saxe-Coburg-Saalfeld, Duchess in Saxony (24 September 1731 – 2 August 1810) was a German duchess.

She was the daughter of Franz Josias, Duke of Saxe-Coburg-Saalfeld and Princess Anna Sophie of Schwarzburg-Rudolstadt. Through her brother Ernest Frederick, Duke of Saxe-Coburg-Saalfeld, she was grandaunt of King Leopold I of Belgium and great-grandaunt of King Leopold II of Belgium, Empress Carlota of Mexico, Queen Victoria of the United Kingdom, King Ferdinand II of Portugal and Prince Gaston, Count of Eu, consort of Isabel, Princess Imperial of Brazil. She was also the maternal grandmother of King Christian VIII of Denmark, twice great-grandmother of King Frederick VII of Denmark and great-great-grandmother of Albert, Prince Consort of the United Kingdom.

Marriage and issue
She married Duke Louis of Mecklenburg-Schwerin (6 August 1725 – 12 September 1778), younger son of Christian Ludwig II, Duke of Mecklenburg-Schwerin.  They had two children:

Ancestry

References 

1731 births
1810 deaths
People from Coburg
Princesses of Saxe-Coburg-Saalfeld
Duchesses of Mecklenburg-Schwerin
Daughters of monarchs